Tell el-Hammam (also Tall al-Hammam) is an archaeological site in Jordan, in the eastern part of the lower Jordan Valley close to the mouth of the Jordan River. The site has substantial remains from the Chalcolithic, Early, Intermediate and Middle Bronze Age, and from Iron Age II. There are different attempts at identifying the site with a biblical city.

Possible identifications in different periods

 In the Late Bronze Age, the area around Tell el-Hammam is identified by many scholars as Abel-Shittim.
 1st century CE – Livias under Herod Agrippa, 4 BCE. Traditionally, the Roman city of Livias is identified with the small Tell er-Rameh, although William F. Albright identified Livias/Bethharam with Tell Iktanu,  ESE of Tell er-Rameh. Recent excavations at Tell el-Hamman have led to the theory that nearby Tell er-Rameh was the commercial and residential centre of Livias, while the administrative centre was located at Tell el-Hammam. In the Roman, Byzantine, and Umayyad periods (165 BC–AD 750) the site was part of the city of Livias (also known as Julias), an important city in Perea, rebuilt by Herod Antipas.

Research history
Claude Reignier Conder recorded the site in the nineteenth century and Père Mallon described it in detail in 1932. Both noted remains of a Roman bath complex that have since disappeared, which presumably gave the tell its name ("Hill of the Hot Baths"). The  renewed campaign of excavations discovered in 2011 a small Byzantine bath installation (5 m x 2 m), reminiscent of the Roman bath at Ramat HaNadiv (southern Mount Carmel, Israel).

After a visit in 1941, Nelson Glueck identified it as the ruins of an Iron Age settlement, which he associated with biblical Abel-Shittim. Australian archaeologist Kay Prag briefly surveyed the site in 1975–1976 while she was working at the adjacent Tell Iktanu. She returned in 1990 to conduct a complete survey and excavate parts of the Bronze Age levels.

Since 2005, excavations at the site have been directed by Steven Collins of Trinity Southwest University, an unaccredited biblical inerrantist institution in the United States. Collins links the site to the legendary biblical city of Sodom, a claim rejected both by scientists and by other biblical literalists. In 2016, a team from the University of Oxford noted that the excavations had resulted in significant disruption to the ancient mound, and archaeologists have expressed concern that by linking the site to Sodom the excavators encourage looting and the illegal trade of antiquities, because objects "marketed explicitly to people seeking a tangible connection with the Bible" are in high demand.

Air burst claim
A group of researchers sponsored by the controversial Comet Research Group, including one member of the current excavation team, published a paper claiming that Tell el-Hammam was destroyed cataclysmically by an air burst. Two-thirds of the authors are members of the Comet Research Group, which also claims that the Younger Dryas were caused by a comet impact. The theory is presented in conjunction with the claim that the site may be the source of the biblical story of the destruction of Sodom.

Others raised doubts about the claim and showed that the authors altered some of the images used as evidence. The authors initially denied tampering with the photos, but eventually published a correction in which they admitted to inappropriate image manipulation. Subsequent concerns that have been brought up in PubPeer have not yet been addressed by the authors, including the discrepancies between the claimed blast wave direction compared to what the images show, the unavailability of original image data to independent researchers, the lack of supporting evidence for conclusions, the inappropriate citation to young Earth creationist literature, and misinformation about the Tunguska explosion.  On February 15, 2023, the following editor’s note was posted on this paper, "Readers are alerted that concerns raised about the data presented and the conclusions of this article are being considered by the Editors. A further editorial response will follow the resolution of these issues."

An op-ed published in Sapiens Anthropology Magazine called the claim "pseudoscientific", suggested that it could erode scientific integrity, and warned that it may lead to the destruction of the site by looters. It also states that few knowledgeable archaeologists believe that the site represents Sodom or Gomorrah.

Physicist Mark Boslough, a specialist in planetary impact hazards and asteroid impact avoidance, has undertaken a sustained critique in social media and in print of the hypothesis that an air burst was responsible for the destruction of human settlements at Tell el-Hammam. His critique calls attention to a perspective of biblical inerrancy that has been used in claims that an air burst destroyed the biblical town of Sodom.

A review of the evidence for an impact event states that the proper criteria for showing an airburst have not been met.

See also
Cities of the Ancient Near East
List of minor biblical places
Plains of Moab
Younger Dryas impact hypothesis

References

External links

Tall el-Hammam Excavation Project

Populated places established in the 5th millennium BC
Populated places disestablished in the 8th century
Archaeological sites in Jordan
Biblical archaeology
Byzantine sites in Asia
Chalcolithic sites of Asia
Populated places in Amman Governorate
Former populated places in Jordan
Livias